Martin Sullivan may refer to:
 Marty Sullivan (1862–1894), Major League Baseball outfielder
 Martin Sullivan (priest) (1910–1980), Anglican Dean of St Paul's
 Martin E. Sullivan (1944–2014), National Portrait Gallery director and former chairman of the U.S. President's Advisory Committee on Cultural Property 
 Martin J. Sullivan (born 1955), former CEO of American International Group